The 1981–82 season was the 58th season in the existence of AEK Athens F.C. and the 23rd consecutive season in the top flight of Greek football. They competed in the Alpha Ethniki and  the Greek Cup. The season began on 6 September 1981 and finished on 30 May 1982.

Overview

After the departure of Loukas Barlos at the end of the previous season, AEK Athens entered in a strange period, which would be marked by administrative changes and successive changes of managers on their bench. The administrative wheel of the club for the season was taken over by the sports goods businessman, Andreas Zafiropoulos. Bajević and Vladić have already left the roster of the team. The new administration proceeded with the renewal of the roster with the addition of Karagiozopoulos from Veria, the promising young striker of Kastoria, Dintsikos, Ballis from Aris, the Yugoslav Radonjić, as the replacement of Bajević and the well-known Bulgarian international, Hristo Bonev, who however, suffered from injuries. Former German international goalkeeper Hans Tilkowski took over at the yellow-black bench. The team did not compete in any European competition.

The championship did not start well at all for the team, as it took the team 5 games to achieve their first victory and in the first 10 matches they counted only 3 wins, a statistic that was recorded as one of the worst starts in their history. The German coach due to the bad results was fired at the end of the first round, 2 days after a defeat against Kastoria. His place was taken by Zlatko Čajkovski, who had won the 1978 double and was beloved by the fans. AEK recovered competitively, but not at an extend to claim any title.

In the Greek Cup, AEK were drawn against PAOK at the round of 16 and were eliminated for second consecutive year, by the club of Thessaloniki. AEK finished the league at 4th place, 5 points behind the champion Olympiacos and managed to secure a spot in next season's European competitions. Top scorer for AEK in the league was again Thomas Mavros with 17 goals. In the few positives of the year, was the transition of the young Stelios Manolas from the position of right back to that of the center back, a position in which he would culminate in the future years with both AEK and the national team.

Players

Squad information

NOTE: The players are the ones that have been announced by the AEK Athens' press release. No edits should be made unless a player arrival or exit is announced. Updated 30 June 1982, 23:59 UTC+3.

Transfers

In

Summer

Winter

Out

Summer

Winter

Loan out

Winter

Overall transfer activity

Expenditure
Summer:  ₯17,000,000

Winter:  ₯0

Total:  ₯17,000,000

Income
Summer:  ₯0

Winter:  ₯0

Total:  ₯0

Net Totals
Summer:  ₯17,000,000

Winter:  ₯0

Total:  ₯17,000,000

Pre-season and friendlies

Alpha Ethniki

League table

Results summary

Results by Matchday

Fixtures

Greek Cup

Matches

AEK Athens qualified to the Round of 16 without a match.

Round of 16

Statistics

Squad statistics

! colspan="9" style="background:#FFDE00; text-align:center" | Goalkeepers
|-

! colspan="9" style="background:#FFDE00; color:black; text-align:center;"| Defenders
|-

! colspan="9" style="background:#FFDE00; color:black; text-align:center;"| Midfielders
|-

! colspan="9" style="background:#FFDE00; color:black; text-align:center;"| Forwards
|-

! colspan="9" style="background:#FFDE00; color:black; text-align:center;"| Left during Winter Transfer Window
|-

|}

Disciplinary record

|-
! colspan="14" style="background:#FFDE00; text-align:center" | Goalkeepers

|-
! colspan="14" style="background:#FFDE00; color:black; text-align:center;"| Defenders

|-
! colspan="14" style="background:#FFDE00; color:black; text-align:center;"| Midfielders

|-
! colspan="14" style="background:#FFDE00; color:black; text-align:center;"| Forwards

|-
! colspan="14" style="background:#FFDE00; color:black; text-align:center;"| Left during Winter Transfer Window

|}

References

External links
AEK Athens F.C. Official Website

AEK Athens F.C. seasons
AEK Athens